Charles Lampkin (1913–1989) was an American actor, musician and lecturer.

Early life

Charles Lampkin was born on March 17, 1913, in Ward 4 of Montgomery, Alabama. He was the third son of Edgar Lampkin and Sarah Bidell. His paternal lineage is traced to British slave-owners and his maternal ancestors were Africans enslaved in the British colonies of Virginia and Georgia before the American Revolution of 1776. His great-grandmother Ann Lampkin, an emancipated slave, was one of the first people to befriend a twenty-five-year-old Booker T. Washington when he arrived in Alabama in 1881. She secured land and along with her church sisters raised funds for the Tuskegee Institute. Edgar Lampkin moved his family from Montgomery to Cleveland in the 1920s, part of the Great Migration.

Career

Lampkin was a pioneer of Spoken Word in the 1930s and winner of Ohio debating cups in 1939, 1940 and 1941.  In Arch Oboler's Five, the first science fiction film about a nuclear holocaust. Lampkin introduced Oboler to The Creation by James Weldon Johnson and convinced him to include excerpts of it in the script of Five. It would become Lampkin's soliloquy and may be the first time that wide audiences in the United States, Latin America and Europe were exposed to African-American poetry, albeit not identified as such.

Charles Lampkin served as Music Director of the American Peoples' Chorus from 1943 to 1945. On June 26, 1944, he conducted Paul Robeson and the APC at the historic Negro Freedom Rally at Madison Square Garden. Uta Hagen and Cardinal Spellman were in attendance.

He composed a piano concerto in G minor before 1955 and in 1969 was appointed Artist-in-residence, Professor of Music and Theatre Arts, at Santa Clara University until 1981.

He was nominated for an Emmy Award in 1979 for his performance in the ABC after-school special Home Run for Love, which aired on national television in the United States in October, 1978 and was re-broadcast in April, 1980.
 
In 1979 Lampkin played Professor Loman in Alex Haley's Roots: The Next Generations.
 
In the 1960s and 1970s Lampkin was a pioneer of multi-cultural pedagogy in California.

Lecture-recitations

In his college classes, Charles Lampkin divided original African-American music into four parts: Spirituals, the Shout Song, the Work Song and the Blues.

Charles Lampkin's performances of the poetry of the Harlem Renaissance set to music he composed were recorded in 1957 for the National Association of English Teachers. The records were distributed to thousands of schools across the United States. The original recording are available at the Charles Lampkin Foundation web site.

The centerpiece of the Charles Lampkin lecture platform was the Black American classic (whose status he helped secure) The Creation from the imaginative sermon series of James Weldon Johnson's God's Trombones.

Academia

In January 1969, Lampkin joined the College of Humanities faculty at the University of Santa Clara as an Artist-in-residence, teaching a course in Beginning Acting and another one in Ethnic Music (until his retirement in 1981). He was also a lecturer at the University of the Pacific (Black Studies Program).

Charles Lampkin Foundation

In 2011, Charles Lampkin's grandson Daniel Bruno created the Charles Lampkin Foundation as a non-profit that aims to counter anti-Intellectualism and the degrading effects of contemporary culture via awareness of the Harlem Renaissance.  The foundation produced a series of videos which utilize Charles Lampkin's 1957 narration combined with relevant historical figures. A two-hour documentary Dreams From My Grandfather combines a movie review of Arch Oboler's FIVE along with rare historical footage of World War II and the nuclear arms race.  With a music score including Sibelius, Holst, Vaughn Williams, Mahler and Bing Crosby, Daniel Bruno's narration includes geopolitical analysis of Japan's motives for siding with the Axis powers and Roosevelt's foreknowledge of the attack on Pearl Harbor.  Outstanding renditions of Negro spirituals by Paul Robeson are heard throughout and in a final twist of irony, the documentary closes with the 10,000 strong Osaka volunteer choir performing Beethoven's Ode To Joy in 2009.

Filmography

References

External links
 
 

1913 births
1989 deaths
American male film actors
Musicians from Montgomery, Alabama
People from the San Francisco Bay Area
Male actors from Montgomery, Alabama
African-American male actors
20th-century American male actors
20th-century American musicians
20th-century African-American musicians